The McHenry Railroad Loop near McHenry, North Dakota was built in 1899 by the Northern Pacific Railway Company.  Also known as McHenry or as End of Line or as Northern Pacific Railroad Turn Around Loop, it was listed on the National Register of Historic Places in 1986.  The listing included .

It is puzzling why the railroad put in a loop of railroad, rather than a far less expensive railroad turntable.  The cost difference at the time would be approximately $5,000 vs. $500.

References

External links
 McHenry Railroad Loop Association
 Museum and visiting information - ND Tourism

Transport infrastructure completed in 1899
Rail infrastructure on the National Register of Historic Places in North Dakota
Railroad museums in North Dakota
Tourist attractions in Foster County, North Dakota
National Register of Historic Places in Foster County, North Dakota
Northern Pacific Railway
1899 establishments in North Dakota